Marinomonas brasilensis is a Gram-negative and aerobic bacterium from the genus of Marinomonas which has been isolated from the coral Mussismilia hispida from the São Sebastião Channel in Brazil.

References

Oceanospirillales
Bacteria described in 2011